Ammoru is a 1995 Indian Telugu-language Hindu mythological fantasy film directed by Kodi Ramakrishna. The film is produced by Shyam Prasad Reddy, under M. S. Arts Unit. It stars Ramya Krishna as Goddess Ammoru and Soundarya as her devotee, Bhavani. Suresh, Rami Reddy, Baby Sunaina, Vadivukkarasi, Kallu Chidambaram, and Babu Mohan play supporting roles. In the film, goddess Ammoru descents to Earth and protects Bhavani from evil forces.

The film's soundtrack was composed by Sri with cinematography by C. Vijay Kumar. Released on 23 November 1995, the film became blockbuster at the box office and received positive acclaim for visual effects. The film won two Nandi Awards. The film was dubbed and released in Tamil as Amman and in Hindi as Maa Ki Shakti. The film was remade in Bengali as Debi (2005) by Swapan Saha.

Plot
An epidemic grips a village in India and the people of the village worship Goddess Ammoru to save them. One night, the Goddess comes down to Earth in the form of an old woman and takes shelter in a fervent woman's house. The Goddess takes an oath to rid the village of the epidemic. She asks the host woman to sprinkle the potion given to her along the village's boundary and promises to stay in the house until she returns. The woman leaves but accidentally peeks at the Goddess who is in her true form. She recollects the promise given to her and commits suicide by jumping into a well. The Goddess now obliged to permanently stay in the house which is later converted into a temple.

Bhavani, a lower caste orphan and an ardent devotee of Goddess Ammoru, is responsible for the arrest of the evil Ghorakh who kills a young girl by burying her alive. As a revenge, Gorakh's sister Leelamma and her family try torture Bhavani. In one of their attempts, Bhavani is married to Ghorakh's nephew Surya, a doctor. Surya leaves for the USA on a business trip, leaving his wife unprotected. When Leelamma tries to kill Bhavani, with the help of Leelamma's creditor, Goddess Ammoru descends to earth. She kills Leelamma's creditor and takes the form of Bhavani's maidservant in order to protect her. She tortures Leelamma, her husband, and her daughter in retaliation. Leelamma's servant realises that the maidservant is Ammoru and stays loyal to her. As Surya returns to India after his American business, Leelamma alleges that Bhavani is involved in an illicit relationship by framing her with another man in their bedroom. But the servant switches Leelama's daughter in the place of Bhavani. The daughter is married to that man by Ammoru.

Meanwhile, Ghorakh is released from jail on the occasion of Gandhi Jayanthi and he decides to take revenge against Bhavani who was responsible for his arrest. First, he tries to kill Bhavani by poisoning her food when she is pregnant. But Goddess Ammoru, who is in the form of the maidservant saves her and helps Bhavani give birth to the baby daughter. Ghorakh realises that some form of virtuous spirit is making his power useless. He finds out that Bhavani's maidservant is goddess Ammoru who is obstructing his evil plans. Ghorakh tricks Bhavani to dismiss her maidservant. Bhavani states that she must not return unless she puts Kumkuma on her head and asks her to come. Ghorakh then kills Bhavani's infant daughter and tortures Surya, with the help of an evil spirit, Chanda. Bhavani prays to Goddess Ammoru to save her but the Goddess cannot respond as Bhavani has not fulfilled the condition of her return. At last, Bhavani puts her hand on the Goddess's trident and she bleeds. Ghorakh pulls her in a bid to disrobe her, causing a few drops of Bhavani's blood to spill on the Goddess' forehead which allows her to return. The Goddess arrives in her fiercest form and kills Ghorakh. She then transforms herself into the maidservant. Surya and Bhavani realise that the maidservant was Ammoru all along. The Goddess returns Bhavani's baby daughter (whom she saved from Ghorakh) to Bhavani and blesses them.

Cast 
 Ramya Krishnan as Goddess Ammoru
 Soundarya as Bhavani
 Baby Sunaina as the Child Servant / Ammoru
 Suresh as Surya
 Rami Reddy as Gopalakrishna "Gorakh"
 Vadivukkarasi as Leelamma
 Babu Mohan as Leelamma's Husband
 Shruthi as Leelamma's daughter
 Kallu Chidambaram as Chidambaram

Production

Development and casting
Shyam Prasad Reddy, who was disappointed with the response of his previous production Aagraham (1991) decided to make a film in Telugu with extensive use of visual effects after watching Terminator 2: Judgment Day (1991). He chose Y. Rama Rao, who assisted Kodandarami Reddy as director and Chinna was cast as a sorcerer, however he was replaced by Rami Reddy. Eeswar Reddy who directed films like Mee Sreyobhilashi (2007) and Manorama (2009) worked in the camera department of the film. Ramya Krishna was selected to portray the role of the goddess and Soundarya was selected to portray her devotee after she was recommended by Babu Mohan. Baby Sunaina was cast as Ammoru's child avatar.

Filming
The filming began in July 1992 at Ayinavilli in the East Godavari district. Despite Y. Rama Rao being announced as director, Shyam Prasad Reddy replaced him with Kodi Ramakrishna after he was not satisfied with the film's outcome. Kodi Ramakrishna revealed that when he was offered to direct the film, he had to read books related to visual effects to improve his knowledge. Vijay C. Kumar, who handled cinematography said that he had to use blue matte for the graphics related shots and the graphics part was handled by Lin Wood. Despite not having a big star cast, the film was shot twice and took three years to complete with the budget of 1.8 crore.

Music
Chakravarthy was initially chosen to compose the music, but since he was unwell at that time his son Sri was selected to compose.

Awards and honours
Filmfare Awards 

 Best Actress – Telugu - Soundarya

Nandi Awards
 Special Jury Award - Shyam Prasad Reddy 
 Best Makeup Artist - M. Chandra Rao

Legacy
The film's success established the trend of mythological fantasy films with visual effects in Telugu cinema with Kodi Ramakrishna directing similar projects like Devi (1999) and Anji (2004) in his career. The film proved to be a launchpad for Soundarya, who went on to become a top most actress in Telugu cinema.

References

External links
 
 Listen to Ammoru songs at Raaga.com

1995 films
1990s Telugu-language films
Films directed by Kodi Ramakrishna
Indian fantasy films
Hindu devotional films
Telugu films remade in other languages
1995 fantasy films